Mikhail Nikitich Muravyov or Murav'ev (–  ) was a Russian poet and prose writer, "one of the best educated and most versatile writers of his generation in Russia". He was influenced by Mikhail Kheraskov and Nikolay Novikov, who invited his contributions to the Masonic publication Utrenni svet.

Works
 Стихотворения [Poems], Leningrad, 1967
 Institutiones rhetoricae: a treatise of a Russian sentimentalist, ed. by Andrew Kahn. Oxford: W.A. Meeuws, 1995.

References

1757 births
1807 deaths
18th-century male writers
18th-century poets from the Russian Empire
People from Smolensk
Recipients of the Order of St. Vladimir, 3rd class
Recipients of the Order of St. Anna, 1st class
Members of the Russian Academy
Burials at Lazarevskoe Cemetery (Saint Petersburg)
Privy Councillor (Russian Empire)